Desi Bernard Wilson (born May 9, 1969) is an American former professional baseball player. He played part of one season in Major League Baseball for the San Francisco Giants in 1996, primarily as a first baseman. He also played one season in Japan with the Hanshin Tigers in 1998. He is currently the hitting coach of the Iowa Cubs, an affiliate of the Chicago Cubs.

Amateur career
Desi Wilson played basketball and baseball for Fairleigh Dickinson University.

Professional career 
Wilson was originally drafted by the Texas Rangers in the 1991 amateur draft. In 1994, he was traded to the Giants, along with Rich Aurilia, for pitcher John Burkett.

Wilson played part of one season on the 1996 Giants, with a .271 batting average over 41 games. He also played in Japan for the Hanshin Tigers in 1998.

Wilson played in the affiliated minor leagues until 2002, then went on to play in the independent leagues until 2007. Overall, he hit .312 in his minor league career. In 2005, while playing for the Surprise Fightin' Falcons, Desi had a 30-game hitting streak and batted .411, setting a Golden Baseball League record.

Post-playing career 
In 2007, Wilson began the season as the manager of the Anderson Joes of the independent South Coast League. Midway through the season, he left the position of manager and was activated as a player. He was then traded to the South Georgia Peanuts where he served as a player-coach for the remainder of the season and was part of the club's SCL championship.  He joined the Cubs organization in 2009 as a hitting coach, joining Daytona in 2012. He was promoted to the hitting coach of the Tennessee Smokies in 2013.

Personal life
Wilson is the father of basketball player D.J. Carton. They have not communicated since Carton was age three or four.

References

External links
, or Retrosheet, or Pura Pelota (Venezuelan Winter League)

1969 births
Living people
African-American baseball players
American expatriate baseball players in Japan
American men's basketball players
Anderson Joes players
Baseball players from New York (state)
Basketball players from New York (state)
Butte Copper Kings players
Charlotte Knights players
Charlotte Rangers players
Chico Outlaws players
Gulf Coast Rangers players
Fairleigh Dickinson Knights baseball players
Fairleigh Dickinson Knights men's basketball players
Hanshin Tigers players
Harrisburg Senators players
Major League Baseball first basemen
Minor league baseball coaches
Minor league baseball managers
Pastora de los Llanos players
Pastora de Occidente players
Phoenix Firebirds players
San Francisco Giants players
Shreveport Captains players
Sioux City Explorers players
Sioux Falls Canaries players
Somerset Patriots players
South Georgia Peanuts players
Sportspeople from Glen Cove, New York
Surprise Fightin' Falcons players
Tiburones de La Guaira players
American expatriate baseball players in Venezuela
Tucson Sidewinders players
Tulsa Drillers players
21st-century African-American people
20th-century African-American sportspeople
Glen Cove High School alumni